Radio Free Roscoe is a Canadian teen comedy-drama television series. The series was filmed in Toronto, Ontario, and produced by Decode Entertainment. It first aired on August 1, 2003, on Family Channel in Canada. It has also been dubbed in French (as required for Canadian federally funded TV shows) in the province of Quebec and aired on Vrak. The show was later aired on U.S. network Noggin's teen block, The N, where the show received funding for a second season. The series ended on May 27, 2005, because The N decided to stop funding the show, and Family, along with Decode Entertainment, could not fill the gap in the production budget. The show was shown on Family until 2007, when it was replaced. In early 2008, The N began rebroadcasting reruns. As of 2019, episodes could still be found on the Canadian station WildBrainTV.

The pilot was first filmed in New Jersey, with an entirely different cast. At that time, the show was going to be based in Nutley, New Jersey and was to be titled Radio Free Nutley. The show was never picked up. Decode Entertainment later decided to move production to Toronto and change the cast and title of the show, leading to the show's production and broadcasting.

Premise 
Four teens in the suburban New Jersey town of Roscoe start attending Henry Roscoe High School. There, they are fed up with their school's radio station, "Cougar Radio", dictating unto the masses how to live, plus the rather overbearing Principal Waller, who seems to favour the popular students, so they create their own pirate radio station called Radio Free Roscoe. Lily Randall, Ray Brennan and Robbie McGrath are old friends, and find a friend in Travis Strong when they form the radio station. Each of them assume a radio alias to conceal their identity.

In their time at Roscoe High, the four friends confront various challenges, such as relationships between the members of RFR and their schoolmates, as well as managing their pirate radio station with their regular lives.

Cast and characters

Main cast 
Note: each member of Radio Free Roscoe assumes a pseudonym for broadcasting the radio show, allowing them to remain anonymous and thus prevent the administration from shutting the show down (pseudonym given in quotation marks).

 Ray "Pronto" Brennan – Al Mukadam
 Robbie "Question Mark" McGrath – Nathan Stephenson
 Lily "Shady Lane" Randall – Kate Todd
 Travis "Smog" Strong / Miss Communication – Nathan Carter

Supporting cast 
 Kim Carlisle – Genelle Williams
 Principal Daniel Waller – Hamish McEwan
 Mickey Stone – Kenny Robinson
 Audrey Quinlan – Ashley Newbrough
 Ted – David Rendall
 Ed – Garen Boyajian
 Parker Haynes – Victoria Nestorowicz (season 2)
 Megan – Hill Kourkoutis (season 2)
 Bridget – Lara Amersey (season 2)
 River Pierce – Steve Belford (season 2)
 Grace Sutter – Julia Alexander (season 2)

The final two episodes of the series ("Dance Around the Truth" and "The Last Dance") included all of the main and supporting cast, excluding Bridget (although she is mentioned) and Audrey.

All members of RFR have been, at some point, part of Cougar Radio. Travis considered joining in Episode One. Ray joined Cougar Radio because he didn't like concealing himself behind his persona "Pronto". Kim Carlisle convinced Robbie to join. Lily joined River Pierce to get air time for her band. Regardless of the rational basis, none of the RFR members departs permanently.

Guest stars 
 Tracey Hoyt – Miss Emily Mitchell
 Ray Mukaddam – Tim Brennan
 Lauren Collins – Blaire
 Skye Sweetnam – Sydney DeLuca
 Jake Epstein – Jackson Torrence
 Aubrey Graham – RFR caller
 The Meligrove Band – Themselves
 The Trews – Themselves
 The Pettit Project – Themselves
 The Rocket Summer – Himself (voice)
 Dan Koch – Himself (voice)
 Mukundan Jr – Himself

Episodes 

There are a total of 52 episodes. On Family, the episodes aired as two seasons, and on The N the episodes aired as four seasons, although both channels have aired all 52 episodes.

Media releases 
There are two official Radio Free Roscoe products.

 Radio Free Roscoe: Season One - Greatest Hits – DVD compilation, VSC Corporation (Video Services Corp.)
 Radio Free Roscoe, Volume 1 – CD compilation

Awards and nominations

Awards
2004 New York Festivals:
World Medal (Silver) for Television Programming & Promotion – Teen Programs (ages 13–17).
 2005 Gemini Awards:
 Best Children's or Youth Fiction Program or Series: Radio Free Roscoe (p. Steven Denure, Neil Court, John Delmage, Douglas McRobb, Will McRobb, Brent Piaskoski, Beth Stevenson. Decode Entertainment Inc.)

Nominations
 2004 Young Artists Awards
 Nominated David Rendall (Radio Free Roscoe) for Best Performance in a Television Series, Recurring Young Actor.
2004 Parents' Foundation Parents' Choice Awards:
Recommended Television Series Winner: Radio Free Roscoe.
2004 Gemini Awards Nominations:
Best Children's or Youth Fiction Program or Series: Radio Free Roscoe (p. Steven Denure, Neil Court, John Delmage, Douglas McRobb, Will McRobb, Brent Piaskoski, Beth Stevenson. Decode Entertainment Inc.)
Best Performance in a Children's or Youth Program or Series: Ali Mukaddam (for "The Awful Truth").
Best Sound in a Dramatic Series: Radio Free Roscoe – Justin Drury and Ric Jurgens (for "There Will Be No Encore Tonight")

International syndication
RFR is currently in syndication on these stations:

RFR was formerly syndicated on these stations:

References

External links

 Radio Free Roscoe official website
 Active Fan Forum
 Radio Free Roscoe at Family.ca
 Radio Free Roscoe at Decode.tv
 
 
 PopGurls interviews with Nathan Carter, and Kate Todd

2000s Canadian comedy-drama television series
2000s Canadian high school television series
2000s Canadian teen drama television series
2000s Canadian teen sitcoms
2003 Canadian television series debuts
2005 Canadian television series endings
English-language television shows
Family Channel (Canadian TV network) original programming
Television series by DHX Media
Fictional radio stations
Canadian Screen Award-winning television shows
The N original programming
Pirate radio
Television series about teenagers
Television shows set in New Jersey
Television shows filmed in Toronto